Gamma is a 1975 Italian science fiction-drama television miniseries directed by Salvatore Nocita and starring Giulio Brogi. The story of a brain transplant on a young race car driver and of its ethical implications, it was broadcast on Rai 1.

Main cast

 Giulio Brogi as Jean Delafoy
 Laura Belli as  Marianne Laforet
 Regina Bianchi as  Daniel's Mother
 Ugo Cardea as  Philippe
 Sergio Rossi as Professor Duvall
 Guido Tasso as  Daniel Lucas
 Nicoletta Rizzi as  Dr. Mayer
 Laura Bottigelli as The Child 
 Maria Grazia Grassini as Madame Oreille
 Walter Maestosi as  Levy-Marchand
 Marcello Mandò as President of the court
 Elio Zamuto as Attorney
 Gianfranco Bellini as Professor Aklund

References

External links
 

1975 television films
1975 films
Italian television miniseries
Films directed by Salvatore Nocita
Italian science fiction television series